Tobias Homp (born 31 October 1963, in Kiel) is a German football manager and former football player.

Honours
Hamburger SV
 DFB-Pokal: 1986–87

References

External links
 

1963 births
Living people
German footballers
German football managers
Bundesliga players
2. Bundesliga players
Hamburger SV players
Hamburger SV II players
FC 08 Homburg players
Association football midfielders
Sportspeople from Kiel